H. Robert Gilmour was a Scottish amateur football inside forward who played in the Scottish League for Queen's Park and Falkirk.

Personal life 
Gilmour served as a second lieutenant in the Royal Garrison Artillery during the First World War.

Career statistics

References

Year of birth missing
Scottish footballers
Scottish Football League players
British Army personnel of World War I
Royal Garrison Artillery officers
Association football inside forwards
Queen's Park F.C. players
Date of death missing
Place of birth missing
Falkirk F.C. players